Manemolla David Makhura (born 22 February 1968) is a South African politician. He served as the 6th Premier of Gauteng following his election in 2014 until his resignation in October 2022. He was also a member of the Member of the Gauteng Provincial Legislature during that time. Makhura is a member of the African National Congress (ANC). Makhura is also the trustee of the board of the Ahmed Kathrada Foundation.

Early life and career

Makhura was born on 22 February 1968 in Buysdorp in the Soutpansberg District in the north of Limpopo Province.

Between 1984 and 2004 Makhura was involved in student and youth politics in the Azanian Student Movement, the Congress of South African Students (COSAS), and the South African Youth Congress, where he served various leadership positions.

As a young student activist, Makhura joined the underground structures of the banned African National Congress (ANC) and the South African Communist Party (SACP) in 1986 and 1987. During his student years at university, Makhura fought against financial exclusion at tertiary institutions. With pressure from student organizations, like the SA Student Congress (SASCO), of which Makhura had been the secretary-general, ensuring that students received funding.

Makhura served as the Provincial secretary of the ANC in Gauteng from 2001 to 2014.

Gauteng Premier

Makhura became the Premier of Gauteng in 2014 after succeeding Nomvula Mokonyane who went on to become a minister in the cabinet of Jacob Zuma. Makhura was the favourite of the provincial ANC leadership, which had in the past been opposed to President Jacob Zuma's leadership.

Crime

In 2014 after taking office Makhura said that the people of Gauteng needed to wage war on crime to protect their children, while speaking at a meeting in the community of Reiger Park as part of the government's Gauteng Township Economy Revitalisation Programme. Makhura spoke at Reiger Park after the shooting of four-year-old Taegrin Morris who had been killed in a botched hijacking the previous month.

In 2016 Makhura laid charges against former head of the Department of Sport, Namhla Siqaza, in a bid to recover more than R800 million in government tenders that had improperly been awarded.

Health

In 2014 the newly built Natalspruit Hospital was officially opened and was christened as the "future of Gauteng Health" by Makhura. The Minister of Health Aaron Motsoaledi, who also attended the opening with Makhura, said that the equipment found inside the hospital was previously only found in private hospitals. The Natalspruit Hospital had cost R 1.7 billion to construct in a period of 8 years and was furnished with 821 beds.

While addressing senior managers, CEOs of Gauteng hospitals, health workers and professionals at the 2016 Khanyisa Service Excellence Awards. Makhura said that although Gauteng had been the best-performing province in 2015, the province could do better.

A survey suggested that 69% of people in Gauteng were satisfied with the provincial healthcare services. Makhura said that it was not good enough and was aiming for 80% satisfactory level by 2019. Makhura said that the Department of Health in Gauteng would spend more than R1.2 billion over three years on the modernisation of public health and R3 billion on equipment.

Employment

Makhura said that he had ambitions to grow the economy of the province, which will create employment for thousands of unemployed people in Gauteng.

Revitalisation of townships

Makhura said that the province was working on a concrete plan to revitalise old townships in the province. He further said that in order to change Human Settlements in five years the province was planning to build 140 000 houses around Gauteng.

All those developments would have major socio-economic benefits with regard to decent employment and economic inclusion.

2019 re-election and second term
Following the May 2019 elections, the ANC announced that it had retained Makhura in his position of Premier of Gauteng. His second term as premier commenced on 22 May 2019, after he defeated the Democratic Alliance's Solly Msimanga for the post.

Resignation 
On 27 June 2022, deputy provincial chairperson Panyaza Lesufi was elected the provincial chairperson of the ANC in Gauteng, succeeding Makhura. In September 2022, the newly elected ANC Gauteng Provincial Executive Committee (PEC) decided to recall Makhura as premier for Lesufi to take over ahead of the 2024 elections. On 4 October 2022, Makhura tendered his resignation as Premier of Gauteng and as a Member of the Gauteng Provincial Legislature, effective 6 October 2022. Lesufi is expected to succeed him.

Personal life
On 10 July 2020, Makhura announced that he had tested positive for COVID-19, becoming the third premier in one week to test positive for the virus.

References

Living people
Premiers of Gauteng
African National Congress politicians
1968 births
Members of the Gauteng Provincial Legislature